Another Animal is the self-titled debut album by the rock band Another Animal. It was released on October 2, 2007. The song "Amends" appeared in the closing credits for the 2008 zombie horror film Insanitarium.

History 
During the writing of IV by Godsmack, lead singer Sully Erna encountered writer's block; so guitarist Tony Rombola, drummer Shannon Larkin, and bassist Robbie Merrill went to the studio and recorded music.  After writing almost 40 songs, only 14 were used.  The left-over songs were then recycled by the members after they recruited Whitfield Crane of Ugly Kid Joe as well as Lee Richards, Godsmack's first guitarist, and Another Animal was born.

Sound 
The music of the album sounds similar to IV, but the vocals are distinct. The album features strong bass-lines and hard-hitting drums; it is predominantly heavier than IV, but includes a few softer songs, including "Fade Away" and "Interlude", which features acoustic guitars and a country sound.

Track listing
All songs written by Another Animal, except where noted.

Singles 
 "Broken Again" (2007)
 "Fade Away" (2008)

Personnel
Band
 Whitfield Crane – lead vocals
 Tony Rombola – lead guitar, backing vocals 
 Robbie Merrill – bass guitar
 Shannon Larkin – drums, lead vocals on "The Thin Line"
 Lee Richards - rhythm guitar, lead vocals on "The Beast Within", "Black Coffee Blues" and "Save Me", backing vocals

Other
Dave Fortman - mixing
Ted Jensen - mastering
Storm Thorgerson - artwork
Wesley Fontenot - mixing assistant

Release history

References 

2007 albums
Another Animal albums
Hard rock albums